Xestaspis is a genus of goblin spiders that was first described by Eugène Louis Simon in 1884.

Species

 it contains 19 species, found in Asia, Africa, Oceania, Yemen, and Sri Lanka:
 Xestaspis biflocci Eichenberger, 2012 — Thailand
 Xestaspis kandy Eichenberger, 2012 — Sri Lanka
 Xestaspis linnaei Ott & Harvey, 2008 — Australia (Western Australia)
 Xestaspis loricata (L. Koch, 1873) (type) — China, Taiwan, Laos, Australia, Micronesia, French Polynesia
 Xestaspis nitida Simon, 1884 — Algeria, Yemen
 Xestaspis nuwaraeliya Ranasinghe & Benjamin, 2016 — Sri Lanka
 Xestaspis padaviya Ranasinghe & Benjamin, 2016 — Sri Lanka
 Xestaspis parmata (Thorell, 1890) — Myanmar, Indonesia (Sumatra, Java, Lombok). Introduced to USA to Panama, Caribbean, Venezuela, Brazil, Madeira, Equatorial Guinea (Bioko), São Tomé and Príncipe, St. Helena, Mauritius, Seychelles, Yemen
 Xestaspis paulina Eichenberger, 2012 — Sri Lanka
 Xestaspis pophami Ranasinghe & Benjamin, 2016 — Sri Lanka
 Xestaspis recurva Strand, 1906 — Ethiopia
 Xestaspis rostrata Tong & Li, 2009 — China
 Xestaspis semengoh Eichenberger, 2012 — Borneo
 Xestaspis sertata Simon, 1907 — Equatorial Guinea (Bioko)
 Xestaspis shoushanensis Tong & Li, 2014 — Taiwan
 Xestaspis sis Saaristo & van Harten, 2006 — Yemen
 Xestaspis sublaevis Simon, 1893 — Sri Lanka
 Xestaspis tumidula Simon, 1893 — Sierra Leone
 Xestaspis yemeni Saaristo & van Harten, 2006 — Yemen

See also
 List of Oonopidae species

References

Araneomorphae genera
Oonopidae
Spiders of Africa
Spiders of Asia
Spiders of Central America
Spiders of Oceania